Life! Camera Action... is a family-drama film directed, written, edited, produced by Rohit Gupta, in his feature-length directorial debut. Starring Dipti Mehta, Shaheed Woods, Noor Naghmi, Swati Kapila, John Crann, this ninety minutes quasi-autobiographical film follows a girl in pursuit of her dreams of becoming a filmmaker against all odds. The film received several awards and nominations. Its theatrical release was limited to film festivals. The film received direct-to-DVD release and subsequently on other video on demand (VOD) platforms.

Life! Camera Action... is of note for its extremely low filming budget ($4000), production value, philosophical inference, and its message widely praised. Silicon India listed it as "One of the 10 Outstanding Movies by Indian American Filmmakers". It made its way to the Limca Book of Records, India's equivalent of the Guinness World Records for being the first full-length motion picture "shot by just a two-member crew".

Cast

 Dipti Mehta as Reina
 Shaheed Woods as Mike
 John Crann as Professor Ed
 Swati Kapila as Simi
 Suneet Kochar as Actress
 Chelsi Stahr as producer Teri
 Subodh Batra as Reina's father
 Noor Naghmi
 Prabha Batra as Reina's mother
 Nina Mehta as Actress
 Bhavesh Patel as Patel DVD store owner

Production

Development
Life! Camera Action... started as Rohit Gupta's ten-minute short film assignment at the New York Film Academy. Shortly after he dropped out of the academy to make it into a full-length feature film. Amanda Sodhi, the co-writer of the film, in response to an advertisement had originally submitted a fifteen-page short film script titled "The Last Shot" loosely based on her own life.>

Filming
The film was shot in guerilla style on Panasonic AG-DVX100 in ten days and roughly edited on Gupta's Mac Book Pro. It was filmed on an initial budget of around $4000 with money raised from his savings that was cleaned up with post-production work costing several thousand dollars before its marketing and release. In an interview Dipti Mehta has said that in an informal meeting before the audition, Gupta thought she was not right for the part, although she was invited at the audition where he failed to recognize her at the first sight. Mehta did get the part and it became her debut film as a lead.

Filming locations
Various locations in New York City, New York Film Academy, Jersey City and Newport Waterfront.

Music
The background score and songs were composed by Manoj Singh. The music was produced in Mumbai, India. The following songs are featured in the film and used as a part of the background score.

Soundtrack 
The score for Life! Camera Action... features two original songs.

Release

Life! Camera Action... opened in numerous international film festivals beginning with its world premiere at the New York Indian Film Festival. Thereafter the film went on to receive numerous accolades around the world before it received a limited DVD distribution deal on 29 October 2012 by New Jersey-based ViVa Entertainment for the Asian Indian market spanning the North American continent. It was initially released via Facebook on 20 July 2012 by Boston-based idistribute Inc., a new media distribution company. On 29 November 2012, the film received another retail DVD distribution platform via Florida-based Dynasty Records through Trans World Entertainment Corporation's national mall-based stores under the brand name FYE (For Your Entertainment), Suncoast and Wherehouse.com. Flipkart, India's largest e-commerce consumer company released the film on 17 February 2013. On International Women's Day, 8 March 2013 the film was released worldwide through Distrify, a UK-based VOD movie distribution company for online streaming and movie download in any global currency. The film was released to other VOD service such as the Amazon Video, BoxTV.

Reception

Life! Camera Action... received critical acclaim. It was invited  at various international film festivals including the New York Indian Film Festival; Williamsburg International Film Festival (WILLiFest) in New York; Mississippi International Film Festival, USA; Cabo Verde International Film Festival (CVIFF), Africa; International Film Festival Antigua & Barbuda; Official World Peace Film Festival, Indonesia; Golden Door Film Festival in USA; Ionian International Film Festival in Greece; Indian International Film Festival of Tampa Bay; Carmarthen Bay International Film Festival in United Kingdom; Treasure Coast International Film Festival, USA; The Social Uprising Resistance and Grass Root Encouragement International Film Festival, in the United States;NFDC Film Bazaar in Goa; Beloit International Film Festival; Filums (LUMS International Film Festival), Pakistan; Boston's Museum of Fine Arts (MFA) South Asian Film Series, USA; Heart of England International Film Festival; Dhaka International Film Festival (Cinema of the World section), Bangladesh; Legacy Media Institute International Film Festival, Virginia; Delhi International Film Festival, India; International Youth Film Festival in the UK; Silent River Film Festival, USA; and others.

Awards and nominations
The film received various accolades including some of the highest honors at its festival run, with the nominations categories mainly ranging from recognition of the film itself (Best Film) to its direction, Film editing, music, screenwriting to the cast's acting performance, mainly Dipti Mehta (Best Actress), Swati Kapila (Best Supporting Actress), Noor Naghmi (Best Supporting Actor) and Shaheed Woods (Best Actor).

Selected Official selections and screenings

Limca Book of records

See also
The Pursuit of Happyness
Go for it! India
Bend It Like Beckham
August Rush
3 Idiots
October Sky

References

External links
Official Website

 

2012 films
2010s musical drama films
Films about filmmaking
American independent films
2010s Hindi-language films
Films set in New Jersey
Films shot in New Jersey
Films shot in New York City
American musical drama films
American avant-garde and experimental films
2012 independent films
Films about Indian Americans
2010s Punjabi-language films
Films about women in the Indian diaspora
Indian musical drama films
Films directed by Rohit Gupta
2010s avant-garde and experimental films
Asian-American drama films
2012 directorial debut films
2012 drama films
2010s English-language films
2010s American films